The Blue Shirts Society (藍衣社), also known as the Society of Practice of the Three Principles of the People (commonly abbreviated as SPTPP), the Spirit Encouragement Society (勵志社, SES) and the China Reconstruction Society (中華復興社, CRS), was a secret ultranationalist faction that modeled Italian fascists in the Kuomintang (KMT, or the Chinese Nationalist Party).

Although in its early stage the society's most important members came from the Whampoa Military Academy, and constituted elements of the KMT's Whampoa Clique, by the 1930s its influence extended into the military and political spheres, and had influence upon China's economy and society. The rise and fall of the Blue Shirt Society was rapid, but obscure, and was seldom mentioned again by either the KMT or the Chinese Communist Party after the establishment of the People's Republic of China and the following KMT domination on Taiwan. Historians, including Paul Jackson and Cyprian Balmires, have classified the Blue Shirt Society as a ‘fascistic’ ultranationalist group rather than a ‘fascist’ group.

Membership
Membership in the Blue Shirts Society was kept a strict secret:

Whole New Culture Movement
Xiao Zuolin (肖作霖), a BSS member early on, drafted a plan called the Whole New Culture Movement and proposed the establishment of an organization called the Chinese Culture Academy to increase the BSS's influence in culture. Xiao got Deng Wenyi's support and carried out his plan by taking over several newspapers and journals, and by enrolling its members in universities. Its scheme of forging a movement for a new culture was adopted by Chiang, and on 19 February 1934, he announced the New Life Movement at a meeting in Nanchang. The plan involved reconstructing the moral system of the Chinese and welcoming a renaissance and reconstruction of Chinese national pride.

In March, Chiang issued guidance, consisting of 95 rules of the New Life Movement, being a mixture of Chinese traditions and western standards. It was a vast propaganda movement, with war mobilization and military maneuvers on a scale that China had never experienced before. But because the plan was so ambitious and rigid, and because its policies created too much inconvenience in the everyday lives of the people, it fell into disfavor. Nearly three years later in 1936, Chiang had to accept that his favorite movement had failed. Deng, Kang and Jiang Xiaoxian (蔣孝先), Chiang's nephew and bodyguard, also BSS members were appointed General Secretariats of the New Life Movement, with supervision of public lifestyles enforced by BSS cadres. By controlling the mouthpieces of the KMT, the BSS openly expressed advocacy of fascism in its publications.

With the New Culture Movement failed but still officially ongoing, the BSS spread its influence into the cultural centers of Shanghai and other major cities that used to be the CC Clique's power base.

See also
 Palingenetic ultranationalism
 Political color
 Political uniform
 Blackshirts
 Brownshirts
 Red Shirts (United States)
Baekuisa: Translated as the white shirts, the group is a South Korean fascist group inspired by the group.

References

General
Ding, San. Lanyishe suipian. Beijing: Renmin wenxue chubanshe, 2003.  
Eastman, Lloyd E. The Abortive Revolution: China under Nationalist Rule, 1927-1937. Cambridge, Massachusetts: Harvard University Press, 1974. .
Wakeman, Frederic, Jr. "A Revisionist View of the Nanjing Decade: Confucian Fascism." The China Quarterly 20, no. 150, Special Issue: Reappraising Republic China (1997): 395–432.
Chung, Dooeum. Élitist Fascism: Chiang Kaishek's Blueshirts in 1930's China. Burlington, Vermont: Ashgate, 2000. .

Specific

1930s in China
1932 establishments in China
Chinese secret societies
Clothing in politics
Far-right politics in Asia
Fascism in Asia
Kuomintang
Military wings of nationalist parties
Organizations established in 1932
Politics of the Republic of China (1912–1949)
Three Principles of the People
Fascist organizations
Anti-communist organizations